"Stand Back" is a 1983 song by Stevie Nicks.

Stand Back may also refer to:

Albums 
 Stand Back (April Wine album), 1975
 Stand Back (The Arrows album), 1984
 Stand Back! Here Comes Charley Musselwhite's Southside Band, 1966/7
 Stand Back: The Anthology, a 2004 album by The Allman Brothers Band
Stand Back, 3CD Stevie Nicks

Songs 
 "Stand Back" (Roxus song), 1989
 "Stand Back", a song by The Allman Brothers Band from Eat a Peach
 "Stand Back", a song by Stephanie Mills from her 1985 self-titled album